Sergio Volpi (born  2 February 1974) is an Italian former footballer who played as a midfielder. Volpi was capped twice for the Italy senior side at international level, and spent over ten seasons in Serie A throughout his career.

Club career
Volpi started his career at Brescia. He then spent his career in Italian top division, for Bari, Venezia, Piacenza, Sampdoria and Bologna. In summer 2009, he moved to Serie B side Reggina, signed a 2-year contract. In January 2010, he was loaned to Serie A struggler Atalanta but the team failed to avoid relegation. On 2 July 2010, his contract with Reggina was terminated.

International career
Volpi made his international debut with the Italy senior side under manager Giovanni Trapattoni, in a friendly match in Palermo against the Czech Republic on 18 February 2004, at the age of 30. Along with Volpi, Simone Barone and Stefano Bettarini also received their first call-up and made their debut during the match, which ended in a 2–2 draw.

Coaching career
Co-currently with retirement, on 18 July 2011 FIGC announced that he passed the Italian second class coach exam (UEFA A license) and eligible to coach Lega Pro teams. Later on the same month in 2011, Volpi was initially appointed together with Andrea Di Cintio as the new coach of Piacenza, but already on August 5, 2011 the technical guidance of the first team passed to the manager of Primavera, Massimo Cerri, with Volpi taking his place at the helm of the Berretti team of the club. On 29 June 2012 he moved to the leadership of the Giovanissimi Nazionali of Brescia. In July 2016 he became manager of ASD Adrense 1909's juniores team. However, he was promoted to first team manager after Marco Piovanelli was fired at the end of November 2016. In April 2018, he won the first historic Serie D promotion of the club. The following year he was confirmed on the club's bench, whose name changed from Adrense to Franciacorta FC. In December 2019, Volpi resigned.

References

External links
 Bologna F.C. Player Profile
 Sergio Volpi National Team Stats at FIGC.it

1974 births
Living people
Italian footballers
Italian football managers
Italy international footballers
Brescia Calcio players
S.S.C. Bari players
Venezia F.C. players
Piacenza Calcio 1919 players
U.C. Sampdoria players
Bologna F.C. 1909 players
Reggina 1914 players
Atalanta B.C. players
Serie A players
Serie B players
Association football midfielders